Burkhard Ebert (born 4 July 1942) is a former German cyclist. He competed at the 1964 Summer Olympics and the 1968 Summer Olympics.

References

External links
 

1942 births
Living people
German male cyclists
Olympic cyclists of the United Team of Germany
Olympic cyclists of West Germany
Cyclists at the 1964 Summer Olympics
Cyclists at the 1968 Summer Olympics
Cyclists from Berlin